Elesun (Elhen) is a rural locality (a selo) in Kurumkansky District, Republic of Buryatia, Russia. The population was 583 as of 2010. There are 11 streets.

Geography 
Elesun is located 40 km southwest of Kurumkan (the district's administrative centre) by road. Baragkhan is the nearest rural locality.

References 

Rural localities in Kurumkansky District